Robert Osborne (29 September 1881 – 19 November 1927) was an Australian cricketer. He played four first-class cricket matches for Victoria between 1904 and 1905.

See also
 List of Victoria first-class cricketers

References

External links
 

1881 births
1927 deaths
Australian cricketers
Victoria cricketers
Cricketers from Melbourne